Zoran Petrović (Serbian Cyrillic: Зоран Петровић; born 10 April 1952) is a retired Serbian football referee.

Career

FIFA World Cup
At the FIFA World Cup, Petrović refereed a total of four matches and served a linesman in two other matches.

At the 1986 World Cup in Mexico, he was the main referee in the Iraq vs. Mexico group stage match, as well as in the Morocco vs. West Germany round of 16 contest.

At the 1990 World Cup in Italy, Petrović was the main referee in the England vs. Netherlands group stage match, as well as in the Sweden vs. Costa Rica group stage match. At the same tournament he performed linesman duties at two more matches - the group stage match Austria vs. United States as well as the round of 16 contest Italy vs. Uruguay.

Furthermore, Petrović refereed the 1992 UEFA Cup Final return leg match at Amsterdam's Olympic Stadium that saw Ajax take on Torino Calcio.

J.League
After being referee on two World Cups, Zoran Petrović signed a professional contract with Japan Football Association and was a referee in Japan's J. League from 1994 until 1997. He won two Best Referee Awards, in 1994 and 1996. His mission in Japan was to pass his experience and knowledge to new Japanese referees.

External sources
 Zoran Petrović (referee) at WorldFootball.net
 Profile at Ogol.

Living people
1952 births
Serbian football referees
FIFA World Cup referees
1990 FIFA World Cup referees
1986 FIFA World Cup referees
Yugoslav football referees